Alfred Krauss (2 February 1908 – 11 June 1957) was a French gymnast. He competed in four events at the 1928 Summer Olympics.

References

1908 births
1957 deaths
French male artistic gymnasts
Olympic gymnasts of France
Gymnasts at the 1928 Summer Olympics
Sportspeople from Haut-Rhin
20th-century French people